Bromo-Seltzer was a brand of antacid formulated to relieve pain occurring together with heartburn, upset stomach, or acid indigestion. It originally contained sodium bromide and acetanilide, both toxic substances which were eventually removed. Its final formulation contained the pain reliever acetaminophen and two reactive chemicals—sodium bicarbonate and citric acid—which created effervescence when mixed with water. Sodium bicarbonate is an antacid.

History
Bromo-Seltzer was invented in 1888 by Isaac E. Emerson and produced by the Emerson Drug Company of Baltimore, Maryland.  It was sold in the United States in the form of effervescent granules that were mixed with water before ingestion. The product took its name from a component of the original formula, sodium bromide; each dose contained 3.2 mEq/teaspoon of it. Bromides are a class of tranquilizers that were withdrawn from the U.S. market in 1975 due to their toxicity. Their sedative effect probably accounted for Bromo-Seltzer's popularity as a hangover remedy. Early formulas also used acetanilide as the analgesic ingredient; it is now known to be poisonous. Acetanilide was replaced with its metabolite acetaminophen. Its final formulation used acetaminophen, sodium bicarbonate, and citric acid, the latter two of which provided the carbonation.

Bromo-Seltzer's main offices and main factory were located in downtown Baltimore, Maryland, at the corner of West Lombard and South Eutaw Streets. The factory's most notable feature was the Emerson Bromo-Seltzer Tower, built in 1911, whose four clock faces are ringed by letters spelling out the product name. The tower was patterned on the Palazzo Vecchio in Florence, Italy, and is listed on the National Register of Historic Places. The tower originally held a 51-foot (16m) representation of a Bromo-Seltzer bottle at its top, glowing blue and rotating on a vertical axis. The sign weighed 20 tons (18.1 tonnes), included 314 incandescent light bulbs, and was topped with a crown. The sign was removed in 1936 because of structural concerns.

In popular culture 
Bromo-Seltzer was mentioned in the 1940 song "Bewitched, Bothered and Bewildered" by Rodgers and Hart.

“Bromo-Fizz” is mentioned in the song “Adelaide’s Lament” in the 1950  musical Guys and Dolls.

Bromo-Seltzer was mentioned in the 1969 song "Pachuco Cadaver" on the album Trout Mask Replica by Captain Beefheart and His Magic Band

Bromo is mentioned in the 1981 film The Postman Always Rings Twice.

Bromo is mentioned in the 1994 Coen brothers film The Hudsucker Proxy. 

In the 1998 The Simpsons episode "Bart Carny", a carnival worker teases a haunted house ride with such claims as: "No surgeon can save you. No Bromo can soothe you."

References

External links

 Bromo-Seltzer at drugs.com
 Emerson Bromo-Seltzer Tower website

Products introduced in 1888
Bromides
Drugs acting on the gastrointestinal system and metabolism